Feng Xueying (born 19 December 1998) is a Chinese badminton player. Feng helped the national team reach the final and win the silver medal at the 2018 Badminton Asia Team Championships held in Alor Setar, Malaysia.

Achievements

BWF World Tour (2 titles)
The BWF World Tour, which was announced on 19 March 2017 and implemented in 2018, is a series of elite badminton tournaments sanctioned by the Badminton World Federation (BWF). The BWF World Tours are divided into levels of World Tour Finals, Super 1000, Super 750, Super 500, Super 300, and the BWF Tour Super 100.

Women's doubles

Mixed doubles

References

External links 
 

1998 births
Living people
Badminton players from Guangdong
Chinese female badminton players
21st-century Chinese women